Fearless is the debut studio album by American singer-songwriter Jazmine Sullivan. It was released on September 23, 2008, through J Records. Production for the album took place during 2007 to 2008 and was handled by several record producers, including Missy Elliott, Stargate, Carvin & Ivan, Wyclef Jean, Jack Splash and Salaam Remi.

The album debuted at number six on the US Billboard 200 chart, selling 65,000 copies in its first week. It also produced three singles that attained respectable charting on Billboards Hot 100 chart. Upon its release, Fearless received generally positive reviews from most music critics who complimented its production and Sullivan's vocals, comparing her to female R&B artists such as Alicia Keys and Lauryn Hill. The album earned Sullivan seven Grammy Award nominations and has sold 517,000 copies in the United States and since been certified platinum by the Recording Industry Association of America (RIAA) for exceeded sales of one million units.

Background 
Sullivan signed to Jive Records in 2003 where she later began providing vocals for other artists such as Kindred the Family Soul. Sullivan graduated from the Philadelphia High School for the Creative and Performing Arts in Philadelphia in 2005, where she was a vocal music major. After graduation, she was dropped from her record label Jive Records, later scrapping her original debut album which remains unreleased. In 2007, Peter Edge, record executive and then president of J Records, saw interest in her after listening to her demo that she recorded for Christina Milian's single "Say I" (2006), he later which offered her a deal with J Records. She eventually began work for her debut studio album.

The lead single, "Need U Bad", produced by Missy Elliott, was released on May 13, 2008. and its music video premiered on July 7, 2008. The song reached number thirty-seven on the Billboard Hot 100 and number one on the Hot R&B/Hip-Hop Songs chart. She later performed the song at the 2008 BET Awards. 
"Bust Your Windows" was released as the second single from the album on September 16, 2008, and its music video premiered in October 2008. It reached number 31 on the Hot 100 and serves as Sullivan's most successful single. It also reached number four on the Hot R&B/Hip-Hop Songs, becoming her second top-ten hit on that chart. Two other singles "Lions, Tigers & Bears" (which reached number 74 on the Hot 100) and "Dream Big" were later released and were accompanied by music videos.

In a September 2008 interview with Pete Lewis of Blues & Soul, Sullivan disccused the album's title and lyrical themes,

Critical reception 

The album received generally positive reviews from most music critics. Sullivan received many comparisons by critics to other well-known female R&B artists, such as Lauryn Hill, Amy Winehouse, Mary J. Blige, and Alicia Keys. Allmusic writer Andy Kellman gave the album 4½ out of 5 stars and praised her performance, stating "There's a lot of range on display here, and there is just as much depth". Vibes Erika Ramirez praised Sullivan's singing and lyrical substance, writing "Sullivan's vocal perfection pilots her debut album... and boasts her self-penned lyrics which are filled with struggle and heartache, embodying every inch of the soul star she is". NOWs Benjamin Boles commended Sullivan for her "strong voice" and the album's production, stating "she’s pulling from a pleasingly wide range of influences – dropping bits of doo-wop, roots reggae, Motown and hip-hop into the mix while maintaining a consistent feel". Q gave it 4 out of 5 stars and wrote "[H]er voice merges Beyonce and Amy Winehouse and is backed by slick productions". Houston Chronicle writer Joey Guerra wrote favorably of her songwriting and called the album "a collection brimming with attitude, edge and soul". Sal Cinquemani of Slant Magazine gave it 4 out of 5 stars and commended Sullivan for her lyrical honesty and musical range. The Washington Posts Allison Stewart described Fearless as "a mix of awkward-but-novel devices (reggae beats, Daft Punk samples) and nakedly confessional songwriting" and called it "a snappy, intensely human debut".

However, Entertainment Weeklys Simon Vozick-Levinson gave Fearless a C+ rating and described most of its music as "schmaltzy pop-&-B". Giving the album 3 out of 5 stars, About.com's Mark Edward Nero viewed her vocals as "generic and lack emotion or urgency" on some songs, but ultimately wrote that "there are more hits than misses here". Nero lauded Sullivan's vocal performance and compared her songwriting to that of R&B musician Ne-Yo, writing "due to both artists' talent for writing on-point, introspective lyrics. Like Ne-Yo, Jazmine has a knack for crafting intricate, deeply personal verses that make you feel at one with the singer. Even on the weaker songs on Fearless, the songwriting is still above par". USA Todays Steve Jones gave the album 3 out of 4 stars and wrote that she "sings every word as if she means it". MusicOMH writer Michael Cragg praised Sullivan's vocal range and themes on the album, writing "Sullivan has created a mature, engaging R&B album that doesn't rely solely on the usual tropes of sexuality, money and posturing. Instead, Fearless deals with real emotions sung in a way that convinces the listener she means every single word". Okayplayer's Jeff Harvey called it "a well produced urban pop album" and wrote that Sullivan's voice "carries a subtle tenderness that adds intriguing nuance". Jon Caramanica of The New York Times wrote favorably of Sullivan's performance and wrote "Her sense of humor is her best asset. She doesn't have a huge, imposing voice, but she's versatile, dabbling in jazz and reggae phrasings with ease".

Commercial performance 
Fearless entered at number six on the Billboard 200, with first week sales of 65,000 copies. It fell to number 10 in its second week, selling 42,000 more copies. The album also peaked at number one on Billboards Top R&B/Hip-Hop Albums chart. As of November 2010, Fearless has sold 517,000 copies in the United States.

Accolades 
She earned five 2009 Grammy Award nominations for the album including Best Female R&B Vocal Performance ("Need U Bad"), Best Traditional R&B Vocal Performance ("In Love with Another Man"), Best R&B Song ("Bust Your Windows"), and Best Contemporary R&B Album, while Sullivan herself was nominated for Best New Artist.

She also earned two 2010 Grammy Award nominations for Best Female R&B Vocal Performance and Best R&B Song ("Lions, Tigers, and Bears"). Vibe magazine named the album one of the Ten Best Albums of 2008.

Track listing 

Sample credits
 "Bust Your Windows" uses a sample from Salaam Remi's "Bad Man Waltz" and interpolates a lyric from Soulja Boy Tell Em's "Crank That (Soulja Boy)"
 "Need U Bad" uses a sample from Nicolas Taylor Stanton's "Higher Meditation Riddim Version", and Tapper Zukie's "Papa Big Shirt"
 "My Foolish Heart" uses a sample from Willie Mitchell's "Groovin'"
 "Lions, Tigers and Bears" uses a sample from Salaam Remi's "Sheila's Playground"
 "Call Me Guilty" uses a sample from Salaam Remi's "Police Theme"
 "Dream Big" uses a sample from Daft Punk's "Veridis Quo"
 "Live a Lie" uses a sample from Salaam Remi's "The Truth"
 "Fear" samples Art of Noise's "Beat Box" and interpolates elements from Stevie Wonder's "I Was Made to Love Her"
 "Switch" uses a sample from Ivy Hunter & William Stevenson "Your Cheating Ways" performed by the Marvelettes

Personnel 
Credits for Fearless adapted from Allmusic.

 June Ambrose – stylist
 Ivan "Orthodox" Barias – various, producer, engineer, tracking, audio production, instrumentation
 Anthony Bell – various, producer, engineer, audio production, instrumentation
 Biz & Riz – bells, Fender Rhodes
 Tim Blacksmith – management
 Anita Marisa Boriboon – art direction, design
 Danny D – management
 Dirty Harry – programming
 Peter Edge – executive producer
 Missy "Misdemeanor" Elliott – producer, engineer, executive producer, audio production
 Mikkel S. Eriksen – various, engineer, instrumentation
 Paul J. Falcone – engineer
 Ron Feuer – piano
 Fisticuffs – various, audio production
 Erwin Gorostiza – creative director
 Carvin "Ransum" Haggins – producer, engineer, tracking, audio production
 Vincent Henry – clarinet, flute, guitar, alto saxophone, baritone saxophhone, tenor saxophone
 Tor Erik Hermanson – various
 Trevor Jerideau – A&R
 Iman Jordan – piano

 Lamb Audio – production
 The Love Life – orchestra various
 Manny Marroquin – mixing
 Pepa – vocals
 David "Mr. Somebody" Pierre – piano, keyboards
 Christian Plata – mixing assistant
 Rebel One – management
 Salaam Remi – bass, percussion, piano, strings, drums, keyboards, executive producer, Fender Rhodes, audio production, instrumentation
 Harold "Jukebox" Robinson – bass
 Malachy Robinson – performer
 Johnnie "Smurf" Smith – keyboards
 Franklin Emmanuel Socorro – engineer
 Jack Splash – arranger, various, producer, performer, audio production
 Jazmine Sullivan – performer, background vocals, producer, executive producer, audio production
 Brian Warfield – performer
 Yusef Williams – hair stylist
 James M. Wisner – engineer
 James Wisner – audio engineer

Charts

Weekly charts

Year-end charts

Certifications

See also
 List of Billboard number-one R&B albums of 2008

References

External links 
 
 Fearless at Discogs
 Jazmine Sullivan Clear for Take Off at Blues & Soul

2008 debut albums
Albums produced by Jack Splash
Albums produced by Missy Elliott
Albums produced by Salaam Remi
Albums produced by Stargate
Arista Records albums
J Records albums
Jazmine Sullivan albums